Elections to Salop County Council were held on Thursday, 5 May 1977.  The whole council of 63 members was up for election and the result was that the Independents gained a narrow majority of one, from no overall control, winning 32 seats, a net gain of two. The Conservatives gained eight seats, ending as the second largest political group with 22, while Labour lost eleven seats and the Liberals gained one, ending with five and four respectively.

Election result

|}

References

1977 English local elections
1977
20th century in Shropshire